Arlington Public Schools is a public school division in Arlington County, Virginia. In 2019, student enrollment was 28,020 students, with students coming from more than 146 countries. In 2015, there were 2,166 teachers. There are 24 elementary schools, 6 middle schools, 4 high schools, 1 secondary institution and 4 other educational programs within the school district.

Forbes magazine named the Washington, D.C. and Arlington area as the top place in the nation to educate one's child in 2022.

In fiscal year 2019, close to $637.1 million was budgeted for the school district.

History
The first public schools in Arlington County, Virginia (then known as Alexandria County) were established in 1870: the Columbia and Walker schools, which were for whites only, and the Arlington School for Negroes in Freedman's Village, which was located on land seized from Robert E. Lee's plantation. In 1932, Hoffman-Boston Junior High School, opened, allowing black students to pursue education past primary school in Arlington for the first time. However, since Hoffman-Boston was not accredited until the 1950s, many black Arlingtonians commuted to Washington, DC to pursue secondary education. In 1947, the NAACP sued the Arlington School Board for not providing equal educational facilities to black students in Constance Carter v. The School Board of Arlington County, Virginia. In 1950, the courts ruled in the NAACP's favor. As a result, increased funding was earmarked to the segregated schools for black students and black teachers began receiving equal pay.

In 1949, after advocacy from a local citizen's group, Arlingtonians for a Better County, Arlington's school board became the first in Virginia to be democratically elected rather than appointed.

In 1954, after the Brown v. Board of Education ruling, all public schools in the United States were required to desegregate. The political leaders of Virginia and the Virginia General Assembly, led by United States Senator Harry F. Byrd, adopted a policy of "massive resistance" to desegregation. Under massive resistance, schools that desegregated would be closed and students would be given money to attend private schools until the schools could be resegregated. Ten days after the Brown ruling, the Arlington County School board began a committee to research how to comply with the ruling. In January 1956, a plan to gradually desegregate Arlington's public schools was released by the committee. Less than a month later, the Virginia General Assembly voted to remove Arlington of its democratically elected school board, which the more conservative Arlington County Board replaced with officials more sympathetic to segregation. The integration plan was overturned by the new school board. That same year, the NAACP, on behalf of black and white students and their families, sued the new school board in an attempt to compel them to integrate in Clarissa Thompson v. the County School Board of Arlington, which was filed concurrently with other integration lawsuits around Virginia.

Many white racial moderates feared that the Board would close public schools rather than allow them to be desegregated. On May 1, 1958, the Arlington Committee to Preserve Public Schools, an all-white group which was neutral on segregation, and dedicated to preventing the closure of public schools, was formed.

On January 19, 1959, the Supreme Court of Virginia effectively ended massive resistance by ruling in James v. Almond that public school closures in violated of the Constitution of Virginia. On January 22, the Arlington County School Board announced that Stratford Junior High would be the first school to be desegregated. On February 2, four black students- Ronald Deskins, Michael Jones, Gloria Thompson and Lance Newman- arrived at Stratford, protected by nearly 100 police officers, hoping to avoid what had happened to the Little Rock Nine. The desegregation of Stratford, the first public school in Virginia to be desegregated, ultimately passed without incident, and an Anti-Defamation League newsletter declared it "The Day Nothing Happened". With this, Arlington County became the first school system in Virginia to desegregate.

Arlington's public schools gradually continued to integrate, although courts only approved of its pupil placement system as being racially neutral in 1971, twelve years after desegregation began. School dances and athletic events were ended in 1959 by the Arlington County School Board after integration began. Athletic events were reinstated in 1961, but school dances were held privately for years afterwards. Hoffman-Boston Junior-Senior High School closed in 1964 and its students were placed in formerly all-white schools. By 1969, all Arlington high schools were desegregated. The only two schools to remain almost completely segregated were Drew Elementary School and Hoffman-Boston Elementary School. In the case John E. Hart et al. v. County School Board of Arlington County, Virginia, parents of Drew Elementary School students sued the Arlington County School Board for further integration. The School Board announced a plan, which the courts approved of, to bus Drew and Hoffman-Boston Elementary School students to other elementary schools around Arlington.

Arlington's school board was eventually allowed to be democratically elected again, rather than be appointed by the Arlington County Board.

In the wake of the August 2017 Charlottesville, Virginia, deadly white supremacist rally protesting the removal of a statue of Robert E. Lee, the Arlington County School Board voted unanimously in June 2018 to rename Washington-Lee High School to remove Lee's name, sparking outrage among many in the community. In the months prior to the name change, the Arlington County school board narrowed several options to "Washington-Loving High School", their top choice in honor of the Loving v. Virginia court case, and "Washington-Liberty High School". On January 10, 2019, the school board voted unanimously for the latter name.

In 2019, Arlington Public Schools celebrated the 60th anniversary of desegregation in Arlington.

Schools

Elementary schools

Abingdon Elementary School
Alice West Fleet Elementary School
Arlington Science Focus Elementary School
Arlington Traditional Elementary School
Ashlawn Elementary School
Barcroft Elementary School
K.W. Barrett Elementary School
Campbell Elementary School (formerly Glencarlyn)
Carlin Springs Elementary School
Claremont Immersion Elementary School
Discovery Elementary School
Dr. Charles R. Drew Elementary School

Glebe Elementary School
Hoffman-Boston Elementary School
Jamestown Elementary School
Francis Scott Key Immersion Elementary School
Long Branch Elementary School
McKinley Elementary School
Montessori Public School of Arlington (formerly Patrick Henry Elementary School)
Nottingham Elementary School
Oakridge Elementary School
Randolph Elementary School
Taylor Elementary School
Tuckahoe Elementary School

Middle schools

Dorothy Hamm Middle School
Gunston Middle School
Kenmore Middle School
Swanson Middle School
Thomas Jefferson Middle School
Williamsburg Middle School

High schools
Wakefield High School
Washington-Liberty High School (formerly Washington-Lee High School)
Yorktown High School

Alternative programs
Arlington Community High School – a fully accredited alternative high school for students whose life circumstances have interrupted their schooling; formerly known as Arlington Mill High School
 Arlington Tech – a high school program with project-based learning
H-B Woodlawn – an alternative secondary program where students control much of their education and do not have "continuous adult supervision". 
Langston High School Continuation Program – offers students flexibility in the way and timeframe in which students can earn a high school diploma.
New Directions – a program designed for 30-35 students with behavioral difficulties that provides support for responsible decision making and on-time graduation
Eunice Kennedy Shriver Program (formerly the Stratford Program) – a secondary school for Arlington Public School students who have special needs.
Thomas Jefferson High School for Science and Technology (TJHSST)

Former schools
Fairlington Elementary School (1944-1979)
Nellie Custis Elementary

Students
In 2019, there was a total student enrollment of 28,020 students, with students coming from more than 146 countries and speaking 107 different languages. Arlington Public Schools has a 95% graduation rate.

In 2009, the student body was 48% white, 26% Latino, 13% black and 11% Asian.

In 2019, the student body was 46% white, 28% Hispanic, 10% black and 9% Asian, with American Indian, Alaskan Native, Native Hawaiian, Pacific Islander, and Multiple backgrounds comprising the remaining 7%.

Teachers 
As of 2019, teachers are paid an average salary of $74,554 per year.

In 2009, there were 2,166 teachers, of which 78% were white, 10% were black, 8% were Hispanic and 3% were Asian.

Arlington County School Board 
 Reid Goldstein, Chair
 Cristina Diaz-Torres, Vice Chair 
 Mary Kadera, Member
 Bethany Sutton, Member
 David Priddy, Member

Arlington County School Board Staff 
 Melanie Elliott, Clerk of the School Board 
 Claudia Mercado, Deputy Clerk and Communications Liaison
 Julieanne Jones, Administrative Assistant
 John Mickevice, Internal Auditor Director

Special facilities

The David M. Brown Planetarium is operated by Arlington Schools Planetarium for both Arlington school field trips and public multimedia programs.  It offers shows for the general public Fridays, Saturdays, and Sundays during the school year. The planetarium is named for astronaut David M. Brown, a graduate of Arlington's Yorktown High School who was killed in the Space Shuttle Columbia disaster in 2003.

The Arlington Outdoor Lab is a 225-acre outdoor facility operated by Arlington Schools and located in Fauquier County. In addition to a large classroom building, the lab facility has a pond, streams, small mountains, and forested areas.

References

External links

 Arlington Public Schools
 David M. Brown Planetarium

School divisions in Virginia
Education in Arlington County, Virginia